Marko Dragičević (born 30 November 1976) is a Croatian rower. He competed in the men's coxless four event at the 2004 Summer Olympics.

References

1976 births
Living people
Croatian male rowers
Olympic rowers of Croatia
Rowers at the 2004 Summer Olympics
Sportspeople from Zadar